Station P may refer to:

 Station P, an encampment in Antarctica
 Station P (ocean measurement site)
 Chugoku Communication Network, also known as Hiroshima Station P